Newham and Essex Beagles Athletic Club is an  athletics club in southeast England.
The club competes in the British Athletics League and Southern League along with the National Junior League and Youth Development League for competitors under the ages of 20 and 17.

History
The club was formed in 1887 as the Beaumont Harriers but became the Essex Beagles in July 1891 and merged with Newham AC in 1985 when it moved from Barking to the Terence McMillan Stadium in the London Borough of Newham, East London. 

The Newham club was extremely close to the site of the 2012 Olympic Games and a number of athletes competed at the event.

In April 2018 the club moved from the Terence McMillan Stadium to the London Marathon Community Track in Queen Elizabeth Olympic Park adjacent to the London Stadium.

Honours

Senior Men:
 British Athletics League
 First Place: 2008,2009,2010
 Second Place: 1979,1998,2000,2003,2012
 Third Place: 1980,1981
 English National Cross Country Championships
 Winners: 2009

Notable athletes

Olympians

 A E Wood
Stephen Hepples
Rob Cole
Keith Gerrard
JJ Jegede
Max Eaves
Ryan Scott
Richard Hurren
Kevin Skinner

Stadium

Named after Terence Mcmillan: First Charter Mayor of Newham 1965–66.

The track was originally cinder although it is not shown on a 1971 OS map. The opening meeting of the synthetic track was on 26 July 1985. It was resurfaced with Polytan PUR in 1995.

The nearest stations are:
Prince Regent DLR station
Custom House station
Plaistow tube station
Canning Town station

Club kit
The club kit consists of a black vest, with a gold horizontal hoop and a yellow vest, with the word Newham in black. The British Men's league kit is designed by Asics.

References

External links
Terence McMillan stadium at RunTrackDirectory.com
Official Club Website

Sport in the London Borough of Newham
Sports venues in London
Athletics in Essex
Athletics clubs in England
1887 establishments in England
Sports clubs in Essex
Sports clubs established in 1887